The Old Dutch Tumbler is a breed of fancy pigeon developed over many years of selective breeding. Old Dutch Tumblers, along with other varieties of domesticated pigeons, are all descendants from the rock pigeon (Columba livia).

See also 
List of pigeon breeds

References

Pigeon breeds
Pigeon breeds originating in the Netherlands